Jewel Nongbak Arengh is a Bangladeshi Garo Awami League politician and the incumbent Member of Parliament from Mymensingh-1. He is the youngest member of parliament and the only Catholic. His father, Promode Mankin, was the State Minister for Social Welfare in the Bangladesh Awami League government.

Career
On 18 July 2016 Arengh was elected to Parliament from Mymensingh-1 in a special election. The special election was held after the seat became vacant after the death of Promode Mankin, the Member of Parliament and father of Jewel Arengh. Areng beat his opponent, Selina Khatun, by 155,866 votes.

References

Awami League politicians
Living people
10th Jatiya Sangsad members
Bangladeshi Roman Catholics
11th Jatiya Sangsad members
1983 births
Garo people